Nicaenetus of Samos was a Greek epic and epigrammatic poet of the 3rd century BC. He was either an Abderite who lived in Samos island or a native Samian. There are four epigrams of his in the Greek Anthology.

References

Ancient Library

Ancient Greek epic poets
Abderites
Ancient Samians
3rd-century BC Greek people
3rd-century BC poets
Epigrammatists of the Greek Anthology
Hellenistic poets